"Azonto" is a song by Nigerian singer Wizkid. It was produced by the record producing and songwriting duo Legendury Beatz. The song was officially released on 28 January 2012. It helped popularize Azonto, a Ghanaian music genre and dance. It peaked at number 19 on the Afribiz Top 100 chart. Wizkid performed the song at Chris Brown's concert, which occurred at the Eko Hotel and Suites in Lagos. Chris Brown also talked about the dance on 106 & Park and credited Wizkid for teaching him.

Music video
The music video for "Azonto" was directed by Moe Musa. It showcases the beauty of the Azonto dance through great choreography.

Accolades
Director Moe Musa was nominated for Best Music Video Director at the 2013 The Headies for his work on "Azonto". The music video for "Azonto" won Most Gifted Video of the Year and was nominated for Most Gifted Male Video at the 2013 Channel O Music Video Awards. Moreover, it was nominated for Best African Act Video at the 5th edition of the 4Syte TV Music Video Awards.

Track listing
 Digital single

References

2013 songs
2013 singles
Wizkid songs
Song recordings produced by Legendury Beatz
Songs written by Wizkid